The 2008 Stone Temple Pilots Reunion Tour was a 75-date reunion tour for the  rock band Stone Temple Pilots, who originally disbanded in 2002. The tour, which kicked off on May 17, 2008 in Columbus, Ohio at the Rock on the Range festival, ran throughout the summer and ended on October 31 at the Verizon Wireless Center in Pelham, Alabama. The Stone Temple Pilots reunion tour was a success, receiving positive reviews from critics and fans alike as well as high ticket sales. At one point, the Stone Temple Pilots tour was ranked at #1 on Pollstar's "Top 50" list. According to Rolling Stone, the band sold an average of $230,000 of tickets a night.

Tour history
After Stone Temple Pilots broke up in 2002, the members formed different side projects; lead singer Scott Weiland formed the supergroup Velvet Revolver with former members of Guns N' Roses, and brothers Robert (bass) and Dean DeLeo (guitar) were in the short-lived band Army of Anyone. Drummer Eric Kretz kept a low-profile, operating out of his own studio, Bombshelter Studios, in Los Angeles. Army of Anyone announced its breakup in 2007 and Weiland left Velvet Revolver on April 1, 2008.

According to Dean DeLeo, steps toward a reunion started with a simple phone call from Weiland's then-wife, Mary Forsberg. She would later invite the DeLeo brothers to play at a private beach party, which led to the reconciliation of Weiland and the DeLeo brothers. In 2007 Dean DeLeo discussed with Weiland an offer from a concert promoter to headline several summer festivals. Weiland accepted and said he had cleared the brief tour with his Velvet Revolver bandmates. Weiland said "everything was cool. Then it wasn't", and stated that the rest of the band stopped talking to him. As a result, Weiland announced in the middle of a Velvet Revolver show on March 21, 2008 in Glasgow that it would be his last performance with the group.

Stone Temple Pilots first show since 2002 was at a private show on April 7 at Harry Houdini's estate outside of Los Angeles. The band performed for a second time on Jimmy Kimmel Live! on May 1, and officially kicked off the tour on May 17 in Columbus.

Despite several positive reviews regarding the tour from fans and critics, there were some negative reviews regarding Scott Weiland's performance at the PNC Bank Arts Center on May 31 in New Jersey. The band was over an hour late onstage, and an intoxicated Weiland mumbled some lyrics and almost lost his balance. He even apologized to his band mates for "messing up".

Due to the death of his father, Eric Kretz did not play with the band for a few shows in October. Ray Luzier, current drummer for Korn and former drummer for Army of Anyone, filled in on drums. Kretz returned for the last few dates of the tour.

Tampa Show Incident
STP had to postpone their performance for the Ford Amphitheatre show (August 22, 2008). The second opening act, Black Rebel Motorcycle Club, played an extended set to push time for STP, ending at 9:30 pm. It wasn't until 10:30 that it was announced the show had been canceled due to the band's inability to make it to the venue as a result of Tropical Storm Fay. Some fans accused the band of canceling due to Weiland not showing up, claiming that they had seen the other members of the band at the venue before it was announced that they were unable to travel. Also, the storm cited as the reason for the cancellation was already well to the north of the route the band would have taken to make it to Tampa from the previous show in Ft. Lauderdale.

Setlist
Not every single show had the same setlist, but all of STP's "hits" were played nightly, with the song "Big Empty" opening every show, except during the Virgin Mobile Festival in Baltimore where the band opened with "Vasoline". The hits "Dead and Bloated" and "Trippin' on a Hole in a Paper Heart" were traditionally the tour's two encore songs, with the band's other hits, deep cuts, and covers played throughout each night's setlist. STP also covered artists such as Queen, The Beatles and Bob Marley on the tour. Black Rebel Motorcycle Club, Pixies singer Black Francis, Meat Puppets, The Secret Machines, Tommy Joe Wilson, (artist signed to Weiland's label Softdrive Records) and 10 Years were the opening bands on the tour. The band came onstage to the song "Manhattan Rumble" by Electric Light Orchestra at the beginning of each performance on the tour.

Tour dates

References

Stone Temple Pilots concert tours
2008 concert tours
Reunion concert tours